Igor Alekseyevich Bragin (born 25 June 1965) is a retired Russian professional footballer.

References

External links 
 
 

1965 births
Footballers from Voronezh
Living people
Soviet footballers
Russian footballers
Association football midfielders
FC Fakel Voronezh players
FC Sever Murmansk players
FC Baltika Kaliningrad players
FC Spartak Tambov players
SV Darmstadt 98 players
2. Bundesliga players
Russian expatriate footballers
Expatriate footballers in Germany